Johann Mayer may refer to:
 Johann Tobias Mayer (1752–1830), German physicist
 Johann Mayer (serial killer) (1886–1923), German serial killer
 Johann Christoph Andreas Mayer (1747–1801), German anatomist
 Johann Friedrich Mayer (theologian) (1650–1712), German Lutheran theologian and professor of theology
 Johann Friedrich Mayer (agriculturist) (1719–1798), German Reformed pastor and agricultural reformer
 Johann Prokop Mayer (1737–1804), Austrian naturalist and botanist

See also
 Johannes Mayer (1893–1963), German general
 Johannes Meyer (disambiguation)